Leica Biosystems (founded 1989) is a medical devices company that develops and supplies clinical diagnostics to the pathology market. It is also a research, instrument, and medical device company as well as a division of Danaher Corporation.

Company Description
The company has headquarters in Germany with operations in the United Kingdom, Ireland, Netherlands, Bulgaria, Australia, India, China, Singapore, Mexico and the United States (California, Illinois, Massachusetts and Ohio).  A research and development facility concentrating on companion diagnostics for cancer drugs has been in operation in Danvers, Massachusetts since August 2012.
 
The Massachusetts facility has partnered with Galena Biopharma to develop companion diagnostics for a breast cancer vaccine.

Leica Biosystems acquired Aperio, an ePathology solutions company, in October 2012. In October 2014, the company announced they will purchase Devicor Medical Products, which is headquartered in Cincinnati and makes medical devices used in breast biopsies.

The company partners with Mayo Clinic’s Department of Laboratory Medicine and Pathology in developing cytogenetics imaging software.

References

See also 
 Wild Heerbrugg
 Heinrich Wild

Danaher subsidiaries
Wetzlar
Companies based in Hesse
Biotechnology companies of Germany